Brevifollis is a Gram-negative genus of bacteria from the family of Verrucomicrobiaceae with one known species (Brevifollis gellanilyticus).

References

 

Verrucomicrobiota
Monotypic bacteria genera
Bacteria genera